Thomas H. Cave (July 16, 1870 – October 20, 1958) was a Vermont political figure who served as State Treasurer.

Early life
Thomas H. Cave, Jr. was born in Berlin, Vermont on July 16, 1870.  He was educated in Montpelier, Vermont and worked briefly as an insurance agent before becoming Secretary of the Granite Manufacturers' Association in Barre.  In 1902 he began work at the National Bank of Barre, where he rose to the position of Cashier.

Cave also received his qualification as a Certified Public Accountant.

A Republican, he was elected to the Vermont House of Representatives in 1910 and served one term.

State Treasurer
In 1912 Cave was appointed Deputy State Treasurer.  He served in this post until taking office as State Treasurer.

In 1922 Cave was the successful Republican nominee for Treasurer.  He served 10 terms, 1923 to 1943.   Cave's 20 years as Treasurer make his tenure the second-longest in Vermont history, behind only Benjamin Swan, who served from 1800 to 1833.

Later career
While serving as Treasurer Cave was also Vice President of Montpelier's Capital Savings Bank and Trust Company.  After retiring as Treasurer he continued at the bank with the title of Vice President and Trust Officer.

Retirement, death and burial
In retirement Cave continued to reside in Barre.  He died in Barre on October 20, 1958.  He was buried in Barre's Hope Cemetery.

References

1870 births
1958 deaths
People from Barre, Vermont
American bankers
American accountants
Republican Party members of the Vermont House of Representatives
State treasurers of Vermont
Burials in Vermont